TVN is a Polish free-to-air television station, network and a media and entertainment group in Poland. It was co-founded by Polish businessmen Mariusz Walter, Jan Wejchert and Swiss entrepreneur Bruno Valsangiacomo.
It is owned by TVN Group, which as of April 2022, is a subsidiary of Warner Bros. Discovery.
Current CEO is Kasia Kieli (who is also president and managing director of TVN Warner Bros. Discovery).

TVN is available by satellite, cable television and digital terrestrial television.

In 2004, with its debut on the Warsaw Stock Exchange, the company became a public limited company. In March 2015, U.S. broadcaster Scripps Networks Interactive bought a 52.7% majority stake in TVN for €584 million. In July 2015, SNI bought out TVN's remaining owners, ITI Group and Canal+ Group, for €584 million, giving it full ownership.

On March 6, 2018, SNI was, in turn, acquired by Discovery, Inc. for US$14.6 billion. Liberty Global, which operated pay television provider UPC Polska, is a major shareholder in Discovery. The European Commission thus required TVN to ensure that TVN24 and TVN24 BiS remain available to third-party television providers.

History
In March 1997 TVN obtained permission from The National Council of Radio Broadcasting and Television to broadcast in central and northern parts of Poland. A few months later TVN merged with Telewizja Wisła, which had a license to broadcast in southern Poland.

The channel was launched as TVN on 3 October 1997. During the first four years the network was run by its founder Mariusz Walter. In 2001 Piotr Walter became chief executive officer, replacing his father.

In 2004 TVN was available in 86% of Polish households. Since 2004 TVN has been listed on the Warsaw Stock Exchange. On 29 April 2004 TVN launched TVN International, an entertainment and news channel for Polish viewers living abroad. In 2005 TVN acquired rights to organise and broadcast Sopot International Song Festival until 2010. In 2006 TVN launched its high definition version, TVN HD, which was first HD programmed broadcast from Poland.

TVN is a supporter of the Hybrid Broadcast Broadband TV (HbbTV) initiative that is promoting and establishing an open European standard for hybrid set-top boxes for the reception of broadcast TV and broadband multimedia applications with a single user interface, and conducted the first tests of HbbTV services in Poland in March 2012.

On 16 March 2015, TVN announced a sale of a 52.7% controlling stake to the U.S. broadcaster Scripps Networks Interactive (SNI) for €584 million, subject to regulatory approval. In July 2015, SNI bought out the remaining owners for €584 million. SNI was, in turn, acquired by Discovery Communications (now Discovery Inc.) for US$14.6 billion, in a sale completed 6 March 2018.

Conflict with Law and Justice government (2021)

TVN tends to be strongly critical of the Polish government under the Law and Justice (PiS) party, since it was sworn to power in 2015. Historian and columnist Timothy Garton Ash, writing for The Guardian, praised Fakty TVN's critical coverage of government issues when harshly criticising Telewizja Polska's Wiadomości (News).The Facts is not BBC-style impartial: it clearly favours a more liberal, pro-European Poland and is strongly anti-PiS. But unlike the so-called News, it is still definitely professional, high quality, reality-based journalism.Since 2020 the conflict between TVN and the PiS worsened, to a degree that, by July 2021, a group of PiS lawmakers, submitted to parliament a draft amendment that would prevent companies from outside the European Economic Area taking control of Polish radio and television stations. This would mean that Discovery, the owner of TVN, might be forced to divest its ownership. The Agreement, then PiS' coalition partner, was opposed to this, they instead proposed a change that would allow companies from countries in the Organisation for Economic Co-operation and Development (OECD) to own more than 49% of shares in Polish media companies, which would mean no change to the American ownership of the channel.

However, opposition, as well as representatives from European Union and the United States criticized the law, and international observers expressed fear that the law is threatening press freedom in Poland. The law has been criticized for "threatening the largest ever US investment in Poland". This also led to protests within the country, with a number of demonstrations on 10 August.

On 11 August 2021, the bill was passed via the Sejm on a vote of 228 to 216, with 10 abstentions, as a result, TVN's licence could expire on September 26.

On 30 August 2021, the Chairman of the National Council of Radio Broadcasting and Television sent to the TV operators a decision to move the licence of sister channel TVN24 into the Discovery Communications Benelux B.V. license, based in the Netherlands. The decision ensures the continuity of broadcasting the TVN24 program after September 26, 2021, regardless of the results of the ongoing conflict with Law and Justice government. On September 24, 2021 - two days before the expiration of the previous licence - TVN24 was granted a new Polish licence.

On 18 December 2021, the bill was passed via the Sejm . The Sejm voted in favor 229-212 with 11 abstentions to override the Senate's veto. Law and Justice (PiS) party and allied opposition group Kukiz'15 voted for the bill, against was the remaining opposition with the exception of far right Confederation, which abstained. The bill was vetoed by Polish President Andrzej Duda on 27 December 2021.

Programming

TV series (Adaptations) 
 Na Wspólnej (Polish version of Barátok közt) – 16 seasons (2003–present)

Docu-soaps 

Ukryta prawda (Polish version of Familien im Brennpunkt) – 12 seasons (2012–present)

TV series (TVN's productions) 
 Druga szansa (Second Chance) – 5 seasons (2016–2018)
 Diagnoza (Diagnosis) – 4 seasons (2017–2019)
 Pułapka (A Trap) – 2 seasons (2018–2019)
 Pod powierzchnią (Under the surface) – 2 seasons (2018–2019)
 Chyłka – 5 seasons (2018–present)
 Motyw (Motive) – 1 season (2019)
 Szóstka (Six) – 1 season (2019)
 Motyw (Motive) – 1 season (2019)
 Kod genetyczny (Genetic Code) – 1 season (2020)
 Królestwo kobiet (Kingdom of Women) – 1 season (2020)
 Żywioły Saszy (Sasha's Elements) – 1 season (2020–present)
 Nieobecni (Absent) – 1 season (2020–present)
 Szadź (Rime) – 2 seasons (2020–present)
 Tajemnica zawodowa (Professional secrecy) – 1 season (2021–present)
 Skazana (Convicted) – 1 season (2021–present)

Docu-soaps 

Szkoła (High School) – 13 seasons (2014–2020)
Szpital (The Hospital) – 14 seasons (2013–2020)
19+ – 10 seasons (2016–present)

Entertainment (Adaptations) 
 Agent – Gwiazdy (Polish version of The Mole) – 6 seasons (2000–2002, 2016–2019)
 Ameryka Express (formerly Azja Express; Polish version of Peking Express) – 3 seasons (2016–present)
Drzewo marzeń (Polish version of The Wishing Tree) – 2 seasons (2017–present)
 Kuchenne rewolucje (Polish version of Kitchen Nightmares) – 18 seasons (2010–present)
 Mam talent! (Polish version of Got Talent) – 13 seasons (2008–2021) (present)
MasterChef (Polish version of MasterChef) – 7 seasons (2012–present)
 MasterChef Junior (Polish version of MasterChef Junior) – 6 seasons (2016–present)
 Milionerzy (Polish version of Who Wants to Be a Millionaire?) – 14 seasons (1999–2003, 2008–2010, 2017–present)
 Projekt Lady (Polish version of Ladette to Lady) – 5 seasons (2016–present)
 Ślub od pierwszego wejrzenia (Polish version of Married at First Sight) – 3 seasons (2016–present)

Entertainment (TVN's productions) 
 Dzień dobry TVN (Good Morning TVN) – 13 seasons (2005–present)
 Dzień Dobry Wakacje (Good Morning Holiday) – 9 seasons (2010–present)
 Efekt Domina (Domino Effect) – 6 seasons (2014–present)
 Kobieta na krańcu świata (Woman at the End of the World) – 9 seasons (2009–present)
 Kuba Wojewódzki – 26 seasons (2006–present)
 Żony Hollywood (Wives of Hollywood) – 3 seasons (2015, 2017)
 36,6 °C – 5 seasons (2017–present)

Information / Reporters 
 Fakty (The Facts) (1997–present)
 Uwaga! (Attention!) (2002–present)
 Superwizjer (2001–present)

Previously on TVN

TV series (Adaptations) 
 Aż po sufit! (Polish version of Packed to the Rafters) – 1 season (2015)
 BrzydUla (Polish version of Yo soy Betty, la fea) – 3 seasons (2008–2009, since 2020)
 Camera Café (Polish version of Camera Café) – 2 seasons (2004)
 Grzeszni i bogaci (Polish version of Le cœur a ses raisons) – 1 season (2009)
 Hela w opałach (Polish version of Grace Under Fire) – 4 seasons (2006–2007, 2010–2011)
 Kasia i Tomek (Polish version of Un gars, une fille) – 3 seasons (2002–2003)
 Klub Szalonych Dziewic (Polish version of Rozengeur & Wodka Lime) – 1 season (2010)
 Majka (Polish version of Juana la virgen) – 2 seasons (2009–2010)
 Mąż czy nie mąż (Polish version of Un Sur 2) – 1 season (2015)
 Nie rób scen (Polish version of Little Mom) – 1 season (2015)
 Niania (Polish version of The Nanny) – 9 seasons (2005–2009)
 Prosto w serce (Polish version of Sos mi vida) – 2 seasons (2010–2011)
 Sędzia Anna Maria Wesołowska (Polish version of Richter Alexander Hold) – 12 seasons (2006–2011)
 Sąd rodzinny (Polish version of Richter Alexander Hold) – 8 seasons (2008–2011)
 Singielka (Polish version of Ciega a citas) – 2 seasons (2015-2016)
 Usta usta (Polish version of Cold Feet) – 5 seasons (2010–2011, since 2020)
 Wawa Non Stop (Polish version of Berlin – Tag&Nacht) – 2 seasons (2013–2014)
 W-11 Wydział Śledczy (Polish version of K11 - Kommissare im Einsatz) – 18 seasons (2004–2014)
 Wszyscy kochają Romana (Polish version of Everybody Loves Raymond) – 1 season (2011–2012)

TV series (TVN's production) 
 13. posterunek 2 (13th Police Station 2) – 1 season (2001)
 39 i pół (39 and a Half) – 3 seasons (2008–2009)
 Anioł stróż (Guardian Angel) – 1 season (2005)
 Belle Epoque – 1 season (2017)
 Detektywi (The Detectives) – 10 seasons (2005–2012)
 Generał (The General) – 1 season (2009)
 Julia – 2 seasons (2011–2012)
 Kocham. Enter (Love. Enter) – 1 season (2013)
 Lot 001 (Flight 001) – 2 seasons (1999–2000)
 Kryminalni (Crime Detectives) – 8 seasons (2004–2008)
 Kryminalne gry (Crime Games) – 1 season (2002–2003)
 Król przedmieścia (King of the Suburbs) – 1 season (2002)
 Lekarze (The Doctors) – 5 seasons (2012–2014)
 Magda M. – 4 seasons (2005–2007)
 Miasteczko (The Town) – 2 seasons (2000–2001)
 Naznaczony (Marked) – 1 season (2009)
 Na Noże (Daggers Drawn) – 1 season (2016)
 Odwróceni (Insiders) – 1 season (2007)
 Prawo Agaty (True Law) – 7 seasons (2012–2015)
 Przepis na życie (Recipe for Life) – 5 seasons (2011–2013)
 Rodziców nie ma w domu (The Parents Are Out) – 2 seasons (1997–1998)
 Sama słodycz (Between the Lines) – 1 season (2014)
 Ten moment (This moment) – 1 season (2015)
 Teraz albo nigdy! (Now or Never!) – 4 seasons (2008–2009)
 Twarzą w twarz (Face to Face) – 2 seasons (2007–2008)
 Układ Warszawski (Diamond Deal) – 1 season (2011)
 Wesołowska i mediatorzy (Wesołowska and Mediators) – 1 season (2015)

Entertainment (Adaptations) 
 Aplauz, aplauz (Polish version of Levantate) – 1 season (2015)
 Big Brother (Polish version of Big Brother) – 3 seasons (2001–2002)
 Chwila prawdy (Polish version of Happy Family Plan) – 4 seasons (2002–2004)
 Ciao Darwin (Polish version of Ciao Darwin) – 2 seasons (2004–2005)
 Cofnij zegar (Polish version of Turn Back Your Body Clock) – 1 season (2011)
 Dla Ciebie Wszystko (Polish version of I'd Do Anything) – 2 seasons (2003–2004)
 Dobra cena (Polish version of The Price Is Right) (1997–1998)
 Dom marzeń (Polish version of Building The Dream) – 2 seasons (2016–2017)
Dzieciaki z klasą (Polish version of Britain's Brainest Kid) – 2 seasons (2004–2005)
 Ekspedycja (Polish version of 71 Degrees North) – 1 season (2001)
 Kawaler do wzięcia (Polish version of The Bachelor) – 1 season (2003)
 Kto poślubi mojego syna? (Polish version of Please Marry My Boy) – 2 seasons (2014–2015)
 Mali Giganci (Polish version of Pequeños Gigantes) – 2 seasons (2015–present)
 Mama kontra mama (Polish version of Mom of the week) – 1 season (2014)
 Mamy Cię! (Polish version of Surprise, Surprise) – 4 seasons (2004–2005, 2015)
 Milion w minutę (Polish version of Minute To Win It) – 2 seasons (2011–2012)
 Najsłabsze ogniwo (Polish version of The Weakest Link) (2004–2006)
 Perfekcyjna pani domu (Polish version of Anthea Turner: Perfect Housewife) – 5 seasons (2012–2014)
 Piekielny Hotel (Polish version of Hotel Hell) – 1 season (2015)
 Project Runway (Polish version of Project Runway) – 2 seasons (2014–2015)
 Polowanie na mieszkanie (Polish version of House Crashers) – 1 season (2016)
 Superniania (Polish version of Supernanny) – 3 seasons (2006–2008)
 Surowi rodzice (Polish version of The World's Strictest Parents) – 3 seasons (2012–2014)
 Taniec z gwiazdami (Polish version of Dancing with the Stars) – 13 seasons (2005–2011)
 Top Model (Polish version of America's Next Top Model) – 6 seasons (2010–present)
 Trafiony, Zatopiony (polish version of Man O Man) – 1 season (2000)
 Trinny & Susannah ubierają Polskę (Polish version of Trinny & Susannah Undress...) – 1 season (2011)
 Trzy serca (Polish version of Alternative Love) – 1 season (2004)
 Ugotowani (Polish version of Come Dine with Me) – 11 seasons (2010–2017)
 Wipeout – Wymiatacze (Polish version of Wipeout) – 1 season (2011)
 Wyprawa Robinson (Polish version of Expedition Robinson) – 1 season (2004)
 X-Factor (Polish version of The X Factor) – 4 seasons (2011–2014)
 You Can Dance – Po prostu tańcz! (Polish version of So You Think You Can Dance) – 9 seasons (2007–2012, 2015–2016)

Entertainment (TVN's production) 
 Bitwa o dom (Battle of the House) – 3 seasons (2013–2014)
 HDin3D Television – 1 season (2011)
 Jestem, jaki jestem (I Am What I Am) – 2 seasons (2003–2004)
 Kapitalny pomysł (A Great Idea) – 1 season (2008–2009)
 Misja! Martyna (Mission! Martyna) – 2 seasons (2004–2005)
 Misja Pies (Mission: Dog) – 1 season (2017)
 Moja krew (My Flesh and Blood) – 1 season (2004)
 Na językach (Lip Service) – 7 seasons (2013–2016)
 Pan i Pani House (Mr & Mrs House) – 1 season (2012)
 Sablewskiej sposób na… (Sablewska's way to...) – 1 season (2016)
 Sekrety chirurgii (Knife Makes Perfect) – 3 seasons (2012–2014)
 Smakuj świat z Pascalem (Taste the World with Pascal) – 3 seasons (2012–2013)
 SOS dla świata (SOS for the World) – 1 season (2011)
 Szymon Majewski Show – 12 seasons (2005–2011)
 Szymon na żywo (Szymon Live) – 1 season (2012)
 Wojciech Cejrowski. Boso (Wojciech Cejrowski. Barefoot) – 2 seasons (2011–2013)
 Woli i Tysio na pokładzie (Woli and Tysio Aboard) – 1 season (2012)

Information/Talk show/Reporters 
 Kawa na ławę (No Beating about the Bush) – (2006–2010)
 Kropka nad i (Dot over I) – (1997–2003)
 Najsztub pyta (Najsztub Questions) – 3 seasons (2004–2005)
 Teraz my! (It's Us Now!) – (2005–2010)

Foreign 
Californication
Chuck
Close to Home
The Closer 
Cold Case
Covert Affairs
Dexter
Eleventh Hour
ER
The Event 
The Following
The Forgotten
Friends
Fringe
Gossip Girl
House M.D.
Human Target
Las Vías del Amor
Marina
Mayday
The Mentalist
Mercy
Monk
Mujer de Madera
NCIS 
NCIS: Los Angeles 
Nip/Tuck
The O.C.
The Omar Series
One Tree Hill
Pasión De Gavilanes
Person of Interest
Pushing Daisies
Rizzoli & Isles
Rubí
Sex and the City
Six Feet Under
Smallville
The Sopranos
Supernatural
Taken
Trauma
United States of Tara
V
The Vampire Diaries
Veronica Mars
The Whole Truth
Without a Trace

Feature films and TV movies 
 Bokser (The Fighter) – 2012
 Cisza (Silence) – 2010
 Generał – zamach na Gibraltarze (The General – The Gibraltar Assassination) – 2009
 Heniek (Henry)
 Kochaj i tańcz (Love and Dance) – 2009
 Krzysztof (Christopher) – 2010
 Laura (Laura) – 2010
 Listy do M. (Letters to Santa) – 2011
 Listy do M. 2 (Letters to Santa 2) – 2015
 Listy do M. 3 (Letters to Santa 3) – 2017
 Los Numeros (Los Numeros) – 2011
 Mój biegun (My Pole) – 2013
 Mój rower (My Father's Bike) – 2012
 Nad życie (Agata – Lose to Win) – 2012
 Obce niebo (Strange Heaven)
 Oszukane (Deceived) – 2012
 Podatek od miłości – 2017/2018
 Świadek koronny (The State Witness) – 2007

Schedule (Autumn 2019)

Primetime schedule

Early fringe schedule

See also
List of programs broadcast by TVN
List of Polish language television channels

References

External links
 

1997 establishments in Poland
TVN
Television channels and stations established in 1997
Television channels in Poland
 
Warner Bros. Discovery networks
Polish news websites